The Shelley-Tipton House, located at 812 W. 4th St. in Garnett, Kansas, was built in about 1871 in Italianate style.  It was listed on the National Register of Historic Places in 1982.

It has a cupola on its low roof.

The listing included three contributing buildings.

References

Houses on the National Register of Historic Places in Kansas
Italianate architecture in Kansas
Houses completed in 1871
Anderson County, Kansas